Momodani Dam is a gravity dam located in Tottori prefecture in Japan. The dam is used for flood control. The catchment area of the dam is 2.5 km2. The dam impounds about 5  ha of land when full and can store 280 thousand cubic meters of water. The construction of the dam was started on 1969 and completed in 1973.

References

Dams in Tottori Prefecture
1973 establishments in Japan